Mathilde Baring (born Mathilde Hoffeldt) was an American actress active during Hollywood's silent era. Her daughter was the actress Isabel Lamon.

Biography 
Mathilde was born in New Orleans to Henry Hoffeldt and Mathilde Gessler. She attended Tulane University before embarking on a career as an actress on the stage and then the screen under the name Mathilde Baring. In addition to her filmography, she also appeared in many plays on Broadway. She was married to Lauren Lamon; the pair had a daughter, Isabel.

Filmography

References 

American stage actresses
American film actresses
Actresses from Louisiana
Tulane University alumni
1954 deaths
1879 births